Bonfoey is a surname. Notable people with the surname include:

 Ann Bonfoey Taylor, née Ann Bonfoey (1910–2007), American aviator, flight instructor, and fashion designer
 Fred. L. Bonfoey (1870–1933), American architect